"Vamos a la playa" is a song by the Italian Italo disco duo Righeira, released in 1983 as the second single from their debut studio album, Righeira (1983). It was written by Johnson Righeira, the duo's lead vocalist and producer Carmelo La Bionda. The song was the duo's only charting hit in the UK, peaking at number 53 on the UK Singles Chart. The single also went to number one in Italy as well as the Swiss Hitparade. On the Dutch Top 40, it got as high as number two, and on the Official German Charts it peaked at number three.

Despite its ostensibly innocuous beach theme, the song actually talks about the explosion of an atomic bomb.

Background and inspiration 

Johnson Righeira came up with the melody for "Vamos a la playa" as he experimented on a keyboard.

In 2017, Righi told Vice journalist Demented Burrocacao how he got the idea for his song:

Critical reception 

Writing for Le journal minimal in 2022, journalist Emmanuelle Veil described the lyrics to "Vamos a la playa" as "acidic". In Fond/Sounds appraisal of Righeira, writer Diego Olivas described "Vamos a la playa" as "one of the bleakest hits to ever soundtrack a summer". In his song review for L'Humanité, Benjamin König described it as a "committed" recording. He added that "it doesn't just talk about sunbathing, but about the end of the nuclear world". Gunter van Assche of De Morgen said that "Vamos a la playa" is "one of the most cynical summer tunes ever". He also comments that "it is a miracle that this melancholy vision of fear became a worldwide hit".

Commercial performance 

"Vamos a la playa" was released in the United Kingdom in 1983 and entered the UK Singles Chart at number 99, moving to its peak of number 53 the next month. In Belgium, "Vamos a la playa" debuted at number 40 on the Ultratop chart on 13 August 1983 and reached a peak of number two. In the Netherlands, "Vamos a la playa" debuted at number 15 on the Dutch Top 40 and reached a peak of two on 10 September 1983. The song reached a peak of number three in Germany, where it remained for one week, before spending a total of 18 weeks on the chart. On the Swiss Singles Chart, "Vamos a la playa" was one of the highest debuting songs on the issue dated 7 August 1983. After two weeks, the song reached the top of the chart for two weeks, becoming Righeira's first number-one single there. According to Italian newspaper la Repubblica, "Vamos a la playa" has sold over three million copies worldwide.

Music video

Reception and analysis 

Arne Siegmund from Watson reviewed the video in 2018, and commented that the video combined "synthesizers, colourful ties and men dancing funny."

Cover versions and usage in media 

Pierre Littbarski performed "Vamos a la playa" for the fifth season of singing television series The Masked Singer. He was eliminated from the competition in week two.

Track listing and formats 

 Italian 7-inch single

A. "Vamos a la playa" (Spanish Version) – 3:40
B. "Vamos a la playa" (Italian Version) – 3:40
 
 Italian 12-inch single

A1. "Vamos a la playa" (Spanish Version) – 5:09
A2. "Vamos a la playa" (Italian Version) – 3:39
B. "Playa Dub" – 6:34

 German 7-inch single

A. "Vamos a la playa" – 3:40
B. "Playa Dub" – 3:35

 German 12-inch maxi-single

A. "Vamos a la playa" – 5:07
B. "Playa Dub" – 7:00

Credits and personnel 

 Johnson Righeira – songwriter, vocals
 Michael Righeira – vocals
 Carmelo La Bionda – songwriter, producer
 Michelangelo La Bionda – producer
 Hermann Weindorf – co-producer, arranger
 Berthold Weindorf – engineering, mixing
 Ben Fenner – engineering, mixing
 Atipiqa – cover art design

Credits and personnel adopted from the Righeira album and 7-inch single liner notes.

Charts

Weekly charts

Year-end charts

TN'T Party Zone version 

The song was covered by German duo TN'T Party Zone in 1992 as "Vamos a la playa '92".

The single reached No. 29 on the German Singles Chart.

Track listing  and formats 

 German CD maxi-single

 "Vamos a la playa '92" (Radio Version) – 3:40
 "Vamos a la playa '92" (Till N' Tiel Party Mix) – 6:04
 "Vamos a la playa '92" (Who Cares Trance Mix) – 5:10
 "Lost in Spain" (El Payo Guitarra Mix) – 4:18

 German 12-inch promotional single

A1. "Vamos a la playa" (Playa Goes Guitarra Mix) – 5:29
A2. "Vamos a la playa" (Vamos is a Rhythm Remix) – 5:40
B. "Get Into the Groove" (Tales of Dance Mix) – 6:04

 German 12-inch maxi-single

A. "Vamos a la playa '92" (Till N' Tiel Party Mix) – 6:04
B1. "Vamos a la playa '92" (Who Cares Trance Mix) – 5:10
B2. "Lost in Spain" (El Payo Guitarra Mix) – 4:18

Charts

Weekly charts

2001: Vamos a la playa 

"2001: Vamos a la playa" is the re-packaged version of the original 1983 version of "Vamos a la playa", released as a single in 2001.

"2001: Vamos a la playa" was released in Italy and Germany in 2001.

Track listing and formats 

 Italian CD maxi-single

 "Vamos a la playa" (Dance Movement Remix) – 4:34
 "Vamos a la playa" (Factory Team Happy Remix) – 5:15
 "Vamos a la playa" (Ottomix Version) – 5:36
 "Vamos a la playa" (DJ Gius Remix) – 6:46
 "Vamos a la playa" (Montefiori Cocktail Remix) – 4:19
 "Vamos a la playa" (Los Amigos Invisibles - Cuyagua's Mix) – 7:18
 "Vamos a la playa" (Le Hammond Inferno - Popskee Remix) – 6:51

 Italian 12-inch single

A1. "Vamos a la playa" (Dance Movement Remix) – 4:34
A2. "Vamos a la playa" (Ottomix Version) – 5:36
B1. "Vamos a la playa" (DJ Gius Remix) – 6:46
B2. "Vamos a la playa" (Le Hammond Inferno - Popskee Remix) – 6:51

 German 12-inch single

A1. "Vamos a la playa" (Le Hammond Inferno - Popskee Remix) – 6:51
A2. "Vamos a la playa" (Montefiori Cocktail Remix) – 4:19
B1. "Vamos a la playa" (Fluorescente Mix) – 5:13
B2. "Vamos a la playa" (Los Amigos Invisibles - Cuyagua's Mix) – 7:18

Credits and personnel 

 Writer: Johnson Righeira, Carmelo La Bionda
 Production: Righeira
 Co-production: Mauro Farina
 Publication: La Bionda Music S.r.l.

See also 

 List of number-one hits of 1983 (Italy)
 List of number-one singles of the 1980s (Switzerland)

References

External links 

 

1983 songs
1983 singles
Compagnia Generale del Disco singles
Number-one singles in Italy
Number-one singles in Switzerland
Righeira songs
Song recordings produced by La Bionda
Songs about nuclear war and weapons
Songs written by Johnson Righeira
Spanish-language songs